Samuel Charles Evan Williams (20 May 1842 – 2 March 1926) was a British politician.

He was elected as a Liberal Member of Parliament representing Radnor in 1880 before resigning in 1884.

References

1842 births
1926 deaths
Liberal Party (UK) MPs for Welsh constituencies
UK MPs 1880–1885